Clement Virgo (born June 1, 1966) is a Canadian film and television writer, producer and director who runs the production company, Conquering Lion Pictures, with producer Damon D'Oliveira. Virgo is best known for co-writing and directing an adaptation of the  novel by Canadian writer Lawrence Hill, The Book of Negroes (2015), a six-part miniseries that aired on CBC Television in Canada and BET in the United States.

Early life 
Virgo was born in Montego Bay, Jamaica. He immigrated to Canada at the age of 11 and grew up in Toronto. In the summer of 1991, he attended the Canadian Film Centre's inaugural Summer Lab initiative as a screenwriter, where he developed the screenplay for what would later become his feature film debut, Rude (1995).

Career

Early work 
At the Canadian Film Centre, Virgo met a number of Canadian filmmakers, including Damon D'Oliveira. Virgo wrote and directed the stylized short film, Save My Lost Nigga' Soul, with D'Oliveira as producer, through the CFC's Short Film Program. The film won Best Film prizes at the Toronto, Fespaco and Chicago Film Festivals.

Virgo and D'Oliveira were invited to participate in the CFC's film residency program in 1992. Together, the pair established Conquering Lion Pictures and produced their first feature film, Rude. It had its world premiere at Cannes as part of the Un certain regard program.

Virgo's next films, The Planet of Junior Brown, which earned an Emmy nomination, and Love Come Down, were followed by Lie with Me, which caused a stir at the 2005 Toronto International Film Festival because it portrayed explicit sexual themes. Starring Lauren Lee Smith and Eric Balfour, Lie With Me had its European premiere at the 2006 Berlin International Film Festival, Panorama Section. It has been distributed internationally, and sold to Showtime in the United States. The film was based on the novel of the same name, written by his wife, the author Tamara Faith Berger.

2007–present 
Virgo next created a boxing drama, Poor Boy's Game, starred Danny Glover and Rossif Sutherland. It was first screened at the 2007 Berlin International Film Festival, Panorama Special Section, and was presented as a Special Selection at the 2007 Toronto International Film Festival. Poor Boy's Game earned Virgo a nomination in 2007 for the Directors Guild of Canada Outstanding Achievement Craft Award for direction of a motion picture film. In a review for Variety, critic Leslie Felperin praised the film's treatment of race, identity and sexuality, declaring it to be Virgo's best work up to that time.

Virgo co-wrote and directed the six-part miniseries adaptation of Lawrence Hill's bestselling novel The Book of Negroes (2015), starring Aunjanue Ellis, Cuba Gooding Jr., Lou Gossett Jr., Ben Chaplin, Jane Alexander and Lyriq Bent. The series aired to wide acclaim and a record-breaking 1.7 million Canadian viewers in January 2015 on CBC in Canada. It premiered in February 2015 in the United States, drawing landmark ratings for BET (Black Entertainment Television.) The series won 11 Canadian Screen Awards, two U.S. Critics Choice Television Awards nominations for Best Limited Series and Best Actress in a Limited Series (Aunjanue Ellis), three 2015 NAACP Image Award Nominations, including Best Miniseries, Best Actor (Cuba Gooding Jr.), Best Actress (Ellis), and the NAACP Award for Best Writing in a TV Movie or Miniseries for Virgo and Lawrence Hill. The Book of Negroes was also named one of 60 finalists for the 2016 Peabody Awards.

Virgo's television credits include The Wire for HBO, The L Word for Showtime, Baz Luhrmann's Netflix drama The Get Down (2016), and American Crime for ABC.  He directed several episodes of the OWN drama series Greenleaf (2016), on which he served as executive producer with Oprah Winfrey.

From 2010 to 2014, Virgo and the Canadian Film Centre co-hosted a series of annual talks to celebrate Black History Month in Toronto, with guests Lee Daniels, Norman Jewison, Spike Lee, Pam Grier, John Singleton, and Chris Tucker.

In 2021 Virgo began production on Brother, an adaptation of the award-winning novel by David Chariandy. In November 2021, he was announced as directing the upcoming Black Cyclone, a biopic on legendary cyclist Major Taylor, for Mind's Eye Entertainment.

Accolades 
In 2017, Virgo and D'Oliveira as Conquering Lion Pictures co-founders received the Canadian Film Centre's Award for Creative Excellence.

Filmography

Film
Split-Second Pullout Technique (1992)
Save My Lost Nigga Soul (1993)
A Small Dick Fleshy Ass Thang (1993)
Rude (1995)
The Planet of Junior Brown (1997)
Love Come Down (2000)
Lie with Me (2005)
Poor Boy's Game (2007)
Brother (2022)
Cyclone (TBA)

Television
Side Effects (1996)
Soul Food (2000)
The Wire
Episode 1.04 "Old Cases" (2002)
Episode 1.12 "Cleaning Up" (2002)
The L Word (2003)
Platinum (2004)
ReGenesis (2005–2006)
The Listener (2009, 7 episodes)
Copper (2013, 1 episode)
The Book of Negroes (2015, 6 episode miniseries)
The Get Down (2016, 1 episode)
American Crime (2016, 1 episode)
Greenleaf (2016, 2 episodes)
Billions (2019, 1 episode)
Empire (2020, 1 episode)
Grand Army (2020, 1 episode)
Dahmer – Monster: The Jeffrey Dahmer Story (2022, 2 episodes)

References

External links

1966 births
Living people
20th-century Canadian male writers
20th-century Canadian screenwriters
21st-century Canadian male writers
21st-century Canadian screenwriters
Black Canadian filmmakers
Black Canadian writers
Canadian Film Centre alumni
Canadian male screenwriters
Canadian television directors
Film directors from Toronto
Jamaican emigrants to Canada
People from Montego Bay
Writers from Toronto